Papaver pygmaeum is a species of poppy known by the common name alpine glacier poppy. It is native to North America, where it can be found in British Columbia, Alberta, and Montana. It has a narrow distribution around the intersection of the three borders. There are about 23 known occurrences, mostly in Montana, with some in Alberta and one in British Columbia. It is present in a number of locations within Glacier National Park.

This perennial herb produces a stem up to 12 centimeters tall from a taproot. The blue-green leaves are up to 5 centimeters long. The flower is about 2 centimeters wide. The petals are yellow, orange-pink, or orange with a yellow spot. The fruit is a rough-haired capsule about 1.5 centimeters long. Blooming occurs in July and August.

This plant grows in high mountain habitat in alpine climates. It grows on rocky terrain such as talus and fell fields.

References

pygmaeum
Flora of Alberta
Flora of British Columbia
Flora of Montana